The women's 3000 metres steeplechase event at the 2001 European Athletics U23 Championships was held in Amsterdam, Netherlands, at Olympisch Stadion on 13 July.

Medalists

Results

Final
13 July

Participation
According to an unofficial count, 12 athletes from 9 countries participated in the event.

 (1)
 (1)
 (3)
 (1)
 (1)
 (1)
 (1)
 (2)
 (1)

References

3000 metres steeplechase
Steeplechase at the European Athletics U23 Championships